Xidu may refer to:

Xidu laptop, a young computer manufacturing company from Shenzhen, China
 Xidu station, a station on Line 5 of the Shanghai Metro
 Xidu Subdistrict, Fengxian District, Shanghai
 Xidu, Hunan, town in and seat of Hengyang County
 Daxi Dam, also known as "", former dam along the Eastern Zhejiang Canal
 Fengxiang County, formerly named Xidu in the Tang Dynasty, Shaanxi